John F. Hayes (1915, Brooklyn, New York – 3 January 2001, Manhattan) was an American politician who served as the Borough President of Brooklyn in 1961.

References

1915 births
2001 deaths
Brooklyn borough presidents